Daniel Boone is a 1936 American historical film directed by David Howard and starring George O'Brien, Heather Angel, and John Carradine.

Plot
In 1775, Daniel Boone leads thirty colonial families to Kentucky where they face two threats: Native American raiders led by renegade white Simon Girty, who opposes the colony; and the schemes of effete Stephen Marlowe to seize title to the new lands. Perils, battles, escapes, and a love interest round out the film.

Cast
George O'Brien as Daniel Boone
Heather Angel as Virginia Randolph
John Carradine as Simon Girty
Ralph Forbes as Stephen Marlowe
George Regas as Black Eagle
Dickie Jones as Master Jerry Randolph
Clarence Muse as Pompey
Huntley Gordon as Sir John Randolph
Harry Cording as Joe Burch
Aggie Herring as Mrs. Mary Burch
Crauford Kent as Attorney General
Keith Hitchcock as Commissioner
Chief John Big Tree as Wyandotte Warrior (uncredited)
Dick Curtis as John Finch - Frontiersman (uncredited)
Baron James Lichter as Ben Stevens (uncredited)
John Merton as Messenger from Richmond (uncredited)
Edward Peil, Sr. as Frontiersman in Lone Wagon (uncredited)
Tom Ricketts as Attorney General's Associate (uncredited)

Soundtrack
Clarence Muse - "Roll on, Wheel" (Written by Clarence Muse)
Clarence Muse - "Make Way" (Written by Jack Stern, Grace Hamilton and Harry Tobias)
Chorus - "In My Garden" (Music by Jack Stern, lyrics by Grace Hamilton)

External links

1936 films
1930s historical adventure films
1936 Western (genre) films
American black-and-white films
Films directed by David Howard
Films set in 1775
Films set in Kentucky
Films set in Virginia
American historical adventure films
American Revolutionary War films
American Western (genre) films
RKO Pictures films
Cultural depictions of Daniel Boone
1930s English-language films
1930s American films